Gustobene is an online gourmet food website that sells imported gourmet Italian foods.

References

 Faccioli, Emilio. L'Arte della Cucina in Italia. Milano: Einaudi, 1987 (in Italian) 
 Capatti, Alberto and Montanari, Massimo. Italian Cuisine: a Cultural History. New York: Columbia University Press, 2003. 
 Del Conte, Anna. The Concise Gastronomy of Italy. USA: Barnes and Nobles Books, 2004. 
 Dickie, John, Delizia! The Epic History of Italians and Their Food (New York, 2008)
 Evans, Matthew; Cossi, Gabriella; D'Onghia, Peter, World Food Italy. CA: Lonely Planet Publications Pty Ltd, 2000.

External links
Gustobene official website
Imported Italian Foods

Catering and food service companies of the United States
Companies based in Chester County, Pennsylvania
American companies established in 2000
Food and drink companies of Italy
2000 establishments in Pennsylvania